Refractive error, also known as refraction error, is a problem with focusing light accurately on the retina due to the shape of the eye and or cornea. The most common types of refractive error are near-sightedness, far-sightedness, astigmatism, and presbyopia. Near-sightedness results in far away objects being blurry, far-sightedness and presbyopia result in close objects being blurry, and astigmatism causes objects to appear stretched out or blurry. Other symptoms may include double vision, headaches, and eye strain.

Near-sightedness is due to the length of the eyeball being too long, far-sightedness the eyeball too short, astigmatism the cornea being the wrong shape, and presbyopia aging of the lens of the eye such that it cannot change shape sufficiently. Some refractive errors occur more often among those whose parents are affected. Diagnosis is by eye examination.

Refractive errors are corrected with eyeglasses, contact lenses, or surgery. Eyeglasses are the easiest and safest method of correction. Contact lenses can provide a wider field of vision; however they are associated with a risk of infection. Refractive surgery permanently changes the shape of the cornea.

The number of people globally with refractive errors has been estimated at one to two billion. Rates vary between regions of the world with about 25% of Europeans and 80% of Asians affected. Near-sightedness is the most common disorder. Rates among adults are between 15-49% while rates among children are between 1.2-42%. Far-sightedness more commonly affects young children and the elderly. Presbyopia affects most people over the age of 35.

The number of people with refractive errors that have not been corrected was estimated at 660 million (10 per 100 people) in 2013. Of these 9.5 million were blind due to the refractive error. It is one of the most common causes of vision loss along with cataracts, macular degeneration, and vitamin A deficiency.

Classification

An eye that has no refractive error when viewing distant objects is said to have emmetropia or be emmetropic meaning the eye is in a state in which it can focus parallel rays of light (light from distant objects) on the retina, without using any accommodation. A distant object, in this case, is defined as an object located beyond 6 meters, or 20 feet, from the eye, since the light from those objects arrives as essentially parallel rays when considering the limitations of human perception.

An eye that has refractive error when viewing distant objects is said to have ametropia or be ametropic. This eye cannot focus parallel rays of light (light from distant objects) on the retina, or needs accommodation to do so.

The word "ametropia" can be used interchangeably with "refractive error". Types of ametropia include myopia, hyperopia and astigmatism. They are frequently categorized as spherical errors and cylindrical errors:
 Spherical errors occur when the optical power of the eye is either too large or too small to focus light on the retina. People with refractive error frequently have blurry vision.
 Nearsightedness: When the optics are too powerful for the length of the eyeball one has myopia or nearsightedness. This can arise from a cornea or crystalline lens with too much curvature (refractive myopia) or an eyeball that is too long (axial myopia). Myopia can be corrected with a concave lens, which causes the divergence of light rays before they reach the cornea.
 Farsightedness: When the optics are too weak for the length of the eyeball, one has hyperopia or farsightedness. This can arise from a cornea or crystalline lens with not enough curvature (refractive hyperopia) or an eyeball that is too short (axial hyperopia). This can be corrected with convex lenses, which cause light rays to converge prior to hitting the cornea.
 Presbyopia: When the flexibility of the lens declines, typically due to age. The individual would experience difficulty in near vision, often relieved by reading glasses, bifocal, or progressive lenses.
 Cylindrical errors cause astigmatism, when the optical power of the eye is too powerful or too weak across one meridian, such as if the corneal curvature tends towards a cylindrical shape. The angle between that meridian and the horizontal is known as the axis of the cylinder.
 Astigmatism: A person with astigmatic refractive error sees lines of a particular orientation less clearly than lines at right angles to them. This defect can be corrected by refracting light more in one meridian than the other. Cylindrical lenses serve this purpose.

Other terminology include anisometropia, when the two eyes have unequal refractive power, and aniseikonia which is when the magnification power between the eyes differ.

Refractive error may be quantified as the error of a wavefront arising from a person’s far point, compared with a plane, or zero vergence, wavefront compared at an appropriate reference plane. The reference plane may be a real plane such as the spectacle plane or the corneal plane, or an imaginary plane such as the first principal plane or the entrance pupil plane. In diopters, spherical refractive errors can be expressed as K=1/k, where k is the distance in meters from the reference plane to an eye’s  far point, and K is the refractive error in diopters. Thus, a person with myopia would have a negative refractive error, a person with emmetropia would have zero refractive error and a person with hyperopia would have a positive refractive error. In the case of regular astigmatism, refractive error needs to be expressed as 3 values: classically as sphere, cylinder and axis. However, it can also be expressed in vector terms, for example, M (mean sphere), J0 (With the rule/Against the rule astigmatism), J45 (oblique astigmatism). Refractive errors containing higher order aberrations (sometimes referred to as irregular astigmatism) can be expressed for a given pupil size using wavefront errors or optical path differences, often as coefficients for Zernike polynomials.  A more subjective quantity visual acuity (expressed as a fraction) may be used, but there is no direct or exact conversion between the two.

Risk factors

Genetics

There is evidence to suggest genetic predilection for refractive error. Individuals that have parents with certain refractive errors are more likely to have similar refractive errors.

The Online Mendelian Inheritance in Man (OMIM) database has listed 261 genetic disorders in which myopia is one of the symptoms. Myopia may be present in heritable connective tissue disorders such as: Knobloch syndrome (OMIM 267750); Marfan syndrome (OMIM 154700); and Stickler syndrome (type 1, OMIM 108300; type 2, OMIM 604841). Myopia has also been reported in X-linked disorders caused by mutations in loci involved in retinal photoreceptor function (NYX, RP2, MYP1) such as: autosomal recessive congenital stationary night blindness (CSNB; OMIM 310500); retinitis pigmentosa 2 (RP2; OMIM 312600); Bornholm eye disease (OMIM 310460).
Many genes that have been associated with refractive error are clustered into common biological networks involved in connective tissue growth and extracellular matrix organization. Although a large number of chromosomal localisations have been associated with myopia (MYP1-MYP17), few specific genes have been identified.

Environmental
In studies of the genetic predisposition of refractive error, there is a correlation between environmental factors and the risk of developing myopia. Myopia has been observed in individuals with visually intensive occupations. Reading has also been found to be a predictor of myopia in children. It has been reported that children with myopia spent significantly more time reading than non-myopic children who spent more time playing outdoors. Socioeconomic status and higher levels of education have also been reported to be a risk factor for myopia.

Diagnosis

Blurry vision may result from any number of conditions not necessarily related to refractive errors. The diagnosis of a refractive error is usually confirmed by an eye care professional during an eye examination using a large number of lenses of different optical powers, and often a retinoscope (a procedure entitled retinoscopy) to measure objectively in which the person views a distant spot while the clinician changes the lenses held before the person's eye and watches the pattern of reflection of a small light shone on the eye.  Following that "objective refraction" the clinician typically shows the person lenses of progressively higher or weaker powers in a process known as subjective refraction.
Cycloplegic agents are frequently used to more accurately determine the amount of refractive error, particularly in children

An automated refractor is an instrument that is sometimes used in place of retinoscopy to objectively estimate a person's refractive error. Shack–Hartmann wavefront sensor and its inverse  can also be used to characterize eye aberrations in a higher level of resolution and accuracy.

Vision defects caused by refractive error can be distinguished from other problems using a pinhole occluder, which will improve vision only in the case of refractive error.

Management
The management of refractive error is done post-diagnosis of the condition by either optometrists, ophthalmologists, refractionists, or ophthalmic medical practitioners.

How refractive errors are treated or managed depends upon the amount and severity of the condition. Those who possess mild amounts of refractive error may elect to leave the condition uncorrected, particularly if the person is asymptomatic. For those who are symptomatic, glasses, contact lenses, refractive surgery, or a combination of the three are typically used.

Glasses 
These are the most effective ways of correcting the refractive error. However, the availability and affordability of eye glasses can present a difficulty for people in many low income settings of the world. Glasses also pose a challenge to children to whom they are prescribed to, due to children's tendency to not wear them as consistently as recommended.

As mentioned earlier refractive errors are because of the improper focusing of the light in the retina. Eyeglasses work as an added lens of the eye serving to bend the light to bring it to focus on the retina. Depending on the eyeglasses, they serve many functions.

 Reading glasses These are general over-the-counter glasses which can be worn for easier reading, especially for defective vision due to aging called presbyopia.
 Single vision prescription lenses They can correct only one form of defective vision, either far-sightedness or near-sightedness.
 Multifocal lenses The multifocal lenses can correct defective vision in multiple focus, for example: near-vision as well as far-vision. This are particularly beneficial for presbyobia.

Contact lenses 
Alternatively, many people choose to wear contact lenses. One style is hard contact lenses, which can distort the shape of the cornea to a desired shape. Another style, soft contact lenses, are made of silicone or hydrogel. Depending on the duration they are designed for, they may be worn daily or may be worn for an extended period of time, such as for weeks.

There are a number of complication associated with contact lenses. Typically the ones that are used daily.

If redness, itching, and difficulty in vision develops, the use of the lenses should be stopped immediately and the consultation of ophthalmologists may be sought.

Surgery 
Laser in situ keratomileusis (LASIK) and photo-refractive keratectomy (PRK) are popular procedures; while use of laser epithelial keratomileusis (LASEK) is increasing. Other surgical treatments for severe myopia include insertion of implants after clear lens extraction (refractive lens exchange). Full thickness corneal graft may be a final option for patients with advanced kerataconus although currently there is interest in new techniques that involve collagen crosslinking. As with any surgical procedure complications may arise post-operatively  Post-operative monitoring is normally undertaken by the specialist ophthalmic surgical clinic and optometry services. Patients are usually informed pre-operatively about what to expect and where to go if they suspect complications. Any patient reporting pain and redness after surgery should be referred urgently to their ophthalmic surgeon.

Medical treatment 
Atropine has believed to slow the progression of near-sightedness and is administered in combination with multifocal lenses. These, however, need further research.

Prevention 
Strategies being studied to slow worsening include adjusting working conditions, increasing the time children spend outdoors, and special types of contact lenses. In children special contact lenses appear to slow worsening of nearsightedness.

A number of questionnaires exist to determine quality of life impact of refractive errors and their correction.

Epidemiology

The number of people globally with refractive errors that have not been corrected was estimated at 660 million (10 per 100 people) in 2013.

Refractive Errors are the first common cause of Visual Impairment and second most common cause of visual loss . The assessment of Refractive Error is now done in DALY ( Disability Adjusted Life Years ) which showed an 8% increase from 1990 to 2019.

The number of people globally with significant refractive errors has been estimated at one to two billion. Rates vary between regions of the world with about 25% of Europeans and 80% of Asians affected. Near-sightedness is one of the most prevalent disorders of the eye. Rates among adults are between 15-49% while rates among children are between 1.2-42%. Far-sightedness more commonly affects young children, whose eyes have yet to grow to their full length, and the elderly, who have lost the ability to compensate with their accommodation system. Presbyopia affects most people over the age of 35, and nearly 100% of people by the ages of 55-65. Uncorrected refractive error is responsible for visual impairment and disability for many people worldwide. It is one of the most common causes of vision loss along with cataracts, macular degeneration, and vitamin A deficiency.

Cost
The yearly cost of correcting refractive errors is estimated at 3.9 to 7.2 billion dollars in the United States.

References

External links 

Vision
Disorders of ocular muscles, binocular movement, accommodation and refraction
Refraction
Wikipedia medicine articles ready to translate
Wikipedia neurology articles ready to translate
Corrective lenses